Claudio Mauricio Grossman Guiloff (born November 26, 1947) is a lawyer and law professor. From 1995 until the summer of 2016, he served as dean of the Washington College of Law of American University in Washington, D.C. He continues to teach at the Washington College of Law and serve as Dean Emeritus.

In November 2016, he was elected to the United Nations International Law Commission (ILC) for a five-year term. He was reelected to the ILC in 2021. In November 2021, he was also appointed Advisor without Portfolio to the Prosecutor of the International Criminal Court.

Grossman has also served as vice chair of the United Nations Committee Against Torture (2003-2008) and as Chairperson (2008-2015). He is a former member of the Inter-American Commission on Human Rights (1993-2001). He was twice elected its president, first in 1996 and again in 2001. He was the IACHR's first Special Rapporteur on the Rights of Women (1996-2000) and its Special Rapporteur on the Rights of Indigenous Populations (2000-2001).

Early life and education
Grossman was born in Valparaíso, Chile. He attended the law school at the University of Chile in Santiago. He received his Licenciado en Ciencias Jurídicas y Sociales in March 1971, with a summa cum laude thesis "Nacionalización y Compensación," coauthored with Carlos Portales.

Career
Grossman served as a lecturer in the University of Chile's Faculty of Law in 1972 and as a research fellow at the Instituto de Estudios Internacionales (Institute of International Studies) at the University of Chile in 1973.

From 1974 to 1980, Grossman was associate professor in international law at the Department of International Organizations of the Europa Institute of the Law School of the University of Utrecht in the Netherlands. In August 1980, Grossman earned the Doctor in de Rechtsgeleerdheid (Doctor of the Science of Law) at the University of Amsterdam. His thesis was Het Beginsel van Non-Interventie in de Organizatie van Amerikaanse Staten (The Principle of Non-Intervention in the Organization of American States).

From 1980 to 1983, Grossman was a professor in international law at the Department of Law, Universiteit Twente.

He is a member of the Crimes Against Humanity Initiative Advisory Council, a project of the Whitney R. Harris World Law Institute at Washington University School of Law in St. Louis to establish the world's first treaty on the prevention and punishment of crimes against humanity.

In November 2021, he was appointed counsel without portfolio to the prosecutor of the International Criminal Court. His appointment received criticism from civil society actors, for his alleged proximity to President Sebastián Piñera, at a time when the Prosecutor's Office was investigating communications denouncing the commission of crimes against humanity during the 2019 Chilean protests.

References

External links
Curriculum Vitae: Claudio Grossman
Faculty Profile: Claudio Grossman

1947 births
Living people
Chilean emigrants to the United States
Chilean people of German descent
Anti-torture activists
Chilean human rights activists
American human rights activists
Members of the United Nations Committee against Torture
People from Santiago
American legal scholars
Chilean officials of the United Nations